Braywatch is a 2020 book by Irish journalist and author Paul Howard and is the twentieth novel in the Ross O'Carroll-Kelly series.

The title refers to the town of Bray, County Wicklow and the TV show Baywatch.

Plot

Ross has become rugby coach at Presentation College, Bray. His daughter Honor has become a Greta Thunberg-style environmentalist.

Reception

Writing in the Dublin Gazette, James Hendicott said that Braywatch was "exactly the kind of ludicrous frivolity that today’s Dublin needs" and that Ross is "so well-written that it’s hard to truly work out if his lack of self awareness, selfishness and deeply spoilt view on life actually make him a bad person, or just a fiercely misguided and unfaithful one who’s a little too stupid to understand fully how disgraceful he is."

Braywatch was nominated for Popular Fiction Book of the Year at the 2020 Irish Book Awards.

References

2020 Irish novels
Penguin Books books
Ross O'Carroll-Kelly
Novels set in County Wicklow
Fiction set in 2018
Fiction set in 2019